Włynkowo railway station is a railway station located in Włynkowo, Pomeranian Voivodeship.

Railway stations in Pomeranian Voivodeship